Yin Meng (born 11 January 1984 in Shijiazhuang). She is retired middle blocker in the China national team.

Career
She was awarded Most Valuable Player of German League and 2005 Junior U-20 World Championship. She signed with Guangzhou Evergrande in 2009.

Clubs
  Hebei (2001–2006)
  Rote Raben Vilsbiburg (2006–2007)
  Hebei (2007–2009)
  Guangdong Evergrande (2009-2011)

Awards

Individuals
 2005 FIVB Junior World Championship "Best Spiker"
 2005 FIVB Junior World Championship "Most Valuable Player"
 2006-2007 German League B "Best Spiker"
 2006-2007 German League B "Most Valuable Player"

Clubs
 2009–10 Chinese League B —  Champion, with Guangdong Evergrande
 2010–11 Chinese League A —  Runner-Up, with Guangdong Evergrande

National team
 2009 Montreux Volley Masters -  Bronze medal

References

Chinese women's volleyball players
Living people
1984 births
Volleyball players from Hebei
Sportspeople from Shijiazhuang
Middle blockers
Chinese expatriate sportspeople
Chinese expatriates in Germany
Expatriate volleyball players in Germany
21st-century Chinese women